Alypius of Antioch was a geographer and a vicarius of Roman Britain, probably in the late 350s AD. He replaced Flavius Martinus after that vicarius' suicide. His rule is recorded is Ammianus XXIII 1, 3.

Life
He came from Antioch and served under Constantius II and was probably appointed to ensure that nobody with western associations was serving in Britain during a time of mistrust, rebellion and suppression symbolised by the brutal acts of the imperial notary Paulus Catena. He may have had to deal with the insurrection of the usurper named Carausius II.

Alypius was afterwards commissioned to rebuild the Temple in Jerusalem as part of Julian's systematic attempt to reverse the Christianization of the Roman Empire by restoring pagan and, in this case, Jewish practices. Among the letters of Julian are two (29 and 30) addressed to Alypius; one inviting him to Rome, the other thanking him for a geographical treatise, which no longer exists.

References

Sources
Todd, M., Roman Britain, Fontana, London 1985
Salway, P., Roman Britain, Oxford, 1986

Jews and Judaism in the Roman Empire
Ancient Romans in Britain
People from Antioch
Roman-era geographers
Roman governors of Britain
4th-century Romans
Late-Roman-era pagans
4th-century geographers